Gheorghe (or György) Fazekas (born 2 January 1958) is a Romanian former figure skater. He represented Romania at the 1972 Winter Olympics in Sapporo, Japan. He also competed at multiple World and European Championships.

Competitive highlights

References 

1958 births
Figure skaters at the 1972 Winter Olympics
Olympic figure skaters of Romania
Romanian male single skaters
Living people
People from Odorheiu Secuiesc